Gymnodanio strigatus is a species of cyprinid fish only found in the Mekong River in Yunnan, China. It is the only described member of its genus.

References

 

Cyprinid fish of Asia
Freshwater fish of China
Fish described in 1992